"Big Time" is a song recorded by American country music artist Trace Adkins.  It was released in May 1998 as the third and final single and title track from the album Big Time.  The song reached #27 on the Billboard Hot Singles & Tracks chart.  The song was written by Larry Boone, Paul Nelson and Kenny Beard.

Chart performance

References

1998 singles
1997 songs
Trace Adkins songs
Songs written by Kenny Beard
Songs written by Larry Boone
Songs written by Paul Nelson (songwriter)
Song recordings produced by Scott Hendricks
Capitol Records Nashville singles